Cambodia competed at the 1964 Summer Olympics in Tokyo, Japan.  The nation returned to the Olympic Games after missing the 1960 Summer Olympics. Thirteen competitors, all men, took part in ten events in three sports.

Boxing

Men

Cycling

Six cyclists represented Cambodia in 1964.

Road

Track
1000m time trial

Men's Sprint

Pursuit

Sailing

Open

References

External links
Official Olympic Reports

Nations at the 1964 Summer Olympics
1964
Olympics